Bronze Tiger (Benjamin "Ben" Turner) is a character appearing in American comic books published by DC Comics. Created by Dennis O'Neil, Leopoldo Durañona, and Jim Berry, he first appeared in Richard Dragon, Kung Fu Fighter #1 (May 1975). The character is considered among the most premiere martial artists, assassins, and spies in the DC Universe. He is most notably depicted as a freelance vigilante, a member of the League of Assassins, and an operative of the Suicide Squad, characterized either as a villain or an antihero due to brainwashing and manipulation from the League of Assassins.

Bronze Tiger has been adapted several times, notably appearing as a recurring The CW Arrowverse show Arrow, portrayed by actor Michael Jai White. In the series, he eventually becomes an ally to Oliver Queen and is the father of the show's version of Connor Hawke.

Publication history
Bronze Tiger first appeared in Dragon's Fists, a novel by Dennis O'Neil and Jim Berry which starred Richard Dragon.

Bronze Tiger's first DC Comics appearance was in Richard Dragon, Kung Fu Fighter #1 (April/May 1975).

Fictional character biography

Early years
Born as Benjamin Turner, Ben comes from an upper-middle-class black neighborhood in Central City. When he was only 10 years old, he saw a burglar attacking his parents, and he proceeded to kill the man with a kitchen knife. In an effort to control the rage inside him, Turner turns to martial arts (and eventually, crime). After some time, Turner decides to travel to the far East to finally come to terms with his demons. There, he meets the O-Sensei, and studies under him, together with later recruit Richard Dragon. The meeting between Turner and Dragon starts the series Richard Dragon, Kung Fu Fighter. Sometime after, they are approached by Barney Ling, from the organization known as G.O.O.D. (Global Organization of Organized Defense), and their (reluctant) working for Ling served as the basis for the Kung Fu Fighter series.

A flashback in DC Comics Presents #39 (1981) shows Richard Dragon discovering that Turner has been brainwashed into becoming the Bronze Tiger by Professor Ojo, then used by Barney Ling (who turns out to be a traitor). Dragon and Turner prove to be equals in the fight, which only ends when Ling is accidentally knocked out a window.

League of Assassins
Later, in Suicide Squad #38, Turner's further career is shown, wherein he and Dragon are hired by King Faraday to work for the C.B.I. (Central Bureau of Intelligence). Assigned to take down the League of Assassins, Dragon and Turner are discovered by the League, who kill Turner's fiancée, Myoshi, and proceed to brainwash Turner. Turner was rid of his demons by channeling them into the identity of the Bronze Tiger, a masked assassin working for the League.

During this time, he also trains the assassin David Cain's daughter, Cassandra, together with other members of the League. As the Bronze Tiger, Turner developed a fearsome reputation in the world, his identity remaining a secret to everyone but the League.

As the Bronze Tiger, Ben was feared worldwide, and the Sensei was smart enough to ensure that Ben hardly ever took off the mask, sending him on a new mission as soon as he finished another. For a time, his identity was secret, and he became one of the most wanted criminals, the Bronze Tiger being a professional assassin, killing on three continents.

Learning of Bronze Tiger's true identity, King Faraday set up a rescue squad of Rick Flag and Nightshade. They retrieved the Tiger, and he was deprogrammed by Amanda Waller, who would later run the Suicide Squad.

Suicide Squad

Waller recruits Turner for the Suicide Squad, setting him up to become the team's leader. Still, he ends up the team's second-in-command under Rick Flag.  On the team's first mission, the Tiger faces Ravan, whom he cripples but refuses to kill. Turner develops a relationship with Vixen while a member of the Squad's support crew, Flo Crawley, nurses a crush on him. Meeting Ravan again later, Turner convinces him to join the Squad, and the two become an effective fighting duo.

The Suicide Squad was mostly populated by villains, but the Tiger is one of the Squad's 'good' members, meant to balance out the cast of characters. He often enforces Waller's rules, such as forcing various Squad members to wear devices designed to force good behavior. A Bronze Tiger solo story appeared as a Bonus Book in Suicide Squad #21 (December 1988).

The nigh-corrupting nature of the Squad eventually leads to Rick Flag's departure and seeming death in a nuclear explosion. Turner becomes the leader of the team, a role in which he excels, often disobeying direct orders to save the lives of his team (even if they were "expendable"). The Squad member Duchess, in reality, the Apokoliptian soldier Lashina, betrays the team and takes many, including Flo, to Apokolips. Flo does not survive the kidnapping.

Turner is eventually confronted by his superiors about his actions, and in the ensuing meeting, Turner's mind snaps. He flees, traveling back to the East (leaving Vixen in the process), where he spends some time as a janissary.

Eventually, Amanda Waller reforms the Squad and again recruits Turner. In the interim, Turner has become a deeply troubled man, one who distances himself from Vixen and was constantly egging on Ravan to confront him. In a mission shortly after the team had reformed, Vixen is hurt, which unlocks Turner's feelings for her once more. He mostly returns to his old state of mind. Vixen later leaves the team, telling Turner she no longer loves him but wishes him well.

In the team's last mission, the Squad struggles to free a small island nation from the tyranny of its seemingly immortal ruler. The team must pass through a forest known for causing hallucinations. While the others experience their own mind trips, Bronze Tiger faces himself. Defeating himself and thereby exorcising his demons, Turner once again becomes a complete person. The tyrant is later defeated by Waller.

Shortly after leaving the Squad, Turner is part of Bruce Wayne's search for Jack Drake (father of Tim Drake) and Shondra Kinsolving, who had been kidnapped. He teams up with Green Arrow and Gypsy, a member of the short-lived Justice League Task Force. Gypsy becomes romantically involved with Tiger. He later becomes her mentor in martial arts.

In a story arc of the Batgirl title in 2005, Cassandra Cain begins a search for her birth mother, who she believes is Lady Shiva. She tracks down Turner in Detroit, where he has opened the "Tiger Dojo". Both are able to come to terms with Turner's involvement in Cassandra's training, and he expresses his pride in her becoming a hero. Bronze Tiger meets with Batman shortly afterward. He has to stop a group of villains and avenge his master.

World War III and beyond
In the World War III event, Bronze Tiger is shown to have retired but is coaxed back into action by Amanda Waller.

In Checkmate (vol. 2) Bronze Tiger rescues Rick Flag from a secret Quraci prison, where Flag had been imprisoned for four years. Notably, he is seen wearing a variant of his costume while with the League of Assassins, complete with a tiger head mask (according to writer Nunzio DeFilippis he wears the mask to prove it no longer has any power over him). Afterward, Amanda Waller appears at the Tiger Dojo, revealing to Ben that she leaked the information about Flag's whereabouts. She then enlists their aid in tracking down a supposedly rogue Suicide Squad team, a team which, in reality, was being run by Flag and Turner at Waller's behest.

In Countdown #39, Bronze Tiger is among the Suicide Squad members trying to bring in Pied Piper and The Trickster.

In a recent appearance in the mini-series Gotham Underground, Bronze Tiger is among the members of the Suicide Squad arresting Two-Face, Mad Hatter, Hugo Strange, and Scarecrow. While frisking Scarecrow, he is gassed by the escaping villain, revealing a previously undiscovered fear of insects.

Bronze Tiger appears in a Blackest Night-related one-shot entitled Blackest Night: Suicide Squad #67 (part of a series of one-shots operating as extra issues to long-since canceled ongoing series). He works with fellow Suicide Squad members Count Vertigo and Rick Flag to bring down a Mexican drug lord. When the Secret Six attempt to break into Belle Reve prison, Bronze Tiger squares off with Catman to see who is the superior feline-themed martial artist.

The New 52

In The New 52 (a 2011 reboot of the DC Comics universe), Bronze Tiger appears as a member of the League of Assassins.

Characterization 
The character is often depicted as a master martial artist whose reputation makes him among the best fighters on Earth in the DC Universe; his skills are often comparable to both Lady Shiva and Richard Dragon, both characters who he is stated to be on par with. In more recent continuities, the character is also hailed as being among the best spies in the world.

Skills and abilities
Bronze Tiger is a master martial artist with lightning-fast reflexes, having studied and trained with numerous martial arts masters in the DC Universe including Kirigi, O-Sensei, and Sensei. While specializing in Taekwondo, the character is said to have mastery in several other forms of martial arts: Boxing, Hapkido, Jeet Kune Do, Silat, Jujutsu, Judo, Karate, Kung Fu, Muay Thai, Wing Chun, and Vale Tudo. In addition to his mastery, he is stated to also have a defense for every style of martial arts. In addition to his skills as a martial artist, Bronze Tiger is also knowledgeable in manipulating his own chi, his usage enabling him to speed up his healing time. He is also considered an effective field leader on the Suicide Squad who draws resources around him and uses them to his best advantage.

From the New 52 onward, the character can shift between his human form and a humanoid, Tiger-like form through a magical talisman supposedly able to grant him enhanced physical prowess at the cost of burning some part of his own soul. In his animal form, he is also seemingly immune to pressure point strikes. Bronze Tiger is also considered to be an expert spy, once being a member of the Syndicate (a council composed of renowned spies like him) and serves as a capable informant in the mercenary community.

Other versions

Amalgam Comics

In Amalgam Comics, the Bronze Panther is the ruler of Wakanda and is named B'Nchalla; an amalgamation of the Bronze Tiger (DC) and the Black Panther (Marvel).

Injustice: Gods Among Us
Bronze Tiger appeared in Year Five of the comic based on the video game of the same name. He is seen with Tweedledum and Tweedledee, Black Mask, Scarecrow, Man-Bat, and Mad Hatter who gang up on Damian Wayne and uses his skills to knock him out. Deadman then possesses Bronze Tiger to knock out the rest of the criminals and himself.

In other media

Television

 Bronze Tiger appears in Batman: The Brave and the Bold, voiced by Gary Anthony Sturgis. This version was a student of Wong Fei and protector of a small village, displaying a great amount of pride as a martial artist. In the episode "Return of the Fearsome Fangs!", he forms a reluctant partnership with Batman to battle the Terrible Trio after the three kill their Sensei. Following the fight, Bronze Tiger decides to reopen Wong Fei's school. The former also makes a non-speaking cameo appearance in the two-part episode "The Siege of Starro!", as one of several heroes possessed by the titular alien.
 Ben Turner / Bronze Tiger appears in Arrow, portrayed by Michael Jai White. In addition to being a martial artist, this version wields two sets of clawed gauntlets, or Tekkō-kagi, that make him a formidable warrior capable of deflecting arrows fired at close range. Additionally, he has a son named Connor. Introduced in the second season episode "Identity", Turner forms an alliance with China White and a Chinese triad, who task him with fighting and killing Oliver Queen / Arrow to ensure he cannot foil their raids on a series of transports carrying medical supplies for Starling City's hospitals. While Turner is eventually incapacitated by Queen and incarcerated, in the episode "Tremors", Turner escapes from prison with the help of an arms dealer, who hires him to steal a prototype earthquake device. Turner retrieves it, but is defeated by Queen and Roy Harper. Upon his return to prison, Turner is approached by Amanda Waller with a proposal to work off part of his sentence. In the episode "Suicide Squad", A.R.G.U.S. releases Turner to participate in a mission with the eponymous team. As of the seventh season episode "Due Process", Turner has become an inmate of Slabside Maximum Security Prison. Initially an ally of Danny Brickwell and Derek Sampson, Turner betrays the former during a prison riot and aids Queen when he offers to give Turner a chance at redemption. In the episode "Training Day", Turner reveals that he witnessed the death of criminal Ricardo Diaz and, in exchange for seeing his son, reveals that Diaz's killer is Emiko Queen. As of the season finale "You Have Saved the City", Turner has been released from Slabside and helps Team Arrow battle Emiko and the Ninth Circle.

Films
 An alternate universe version of Bronze Tiger, with elements of the Cheetah, appears in Justice League: Gods and Monsters, voiced by Arif S. Kinchen.
 Bronze Tiger appears in Suicide Squad: Hell to Pay, voiced by Billy Brown. This version was a former CIA agent who became a vigilante after his fiancée was murdered by a former member of the League of Assassins and vowed never to take an innocent life. Turner is recruited by Amanda Waller's Task Force X program and tasked with retrieving a mystical "Get Out of Hell Free" card by any means necessary. Throughout the mission, Turner develops animosity towards the assassin and leader Deadshot. After the latter abandons the team to see his daughter, Waller appoints Turner as the squad's new leader. When Professor Zoom's henchmen kidnap and recruit Killer Frost, Turner leads the squad in tracking her, only to be severely injured by an explosive trap set up by Zoom. The squad drops off Turner at the hospital before Deadshot reassumes leadership and leads them in continuing the mission without him. Despite his injuries, Turner returns during the squad's final confrontation with Zoom, sacrificing himself to distract the speedster long enough for Deadshot to kill him. Before he dies, Turner makes peace with Deadshot, who gives him the "Get Out of Hell Free" card in return.
 Bronze Tiger appears in Batman: Soul of the Dragon, with Michael Jai White reprising the role.

Video games
 Bronze Tiger appears as a boss in Batman: Arkham Origins Blackgate, voiced again by Gary Anthony Sturgis. This version is the champion of prison fights held in the titular prison. In a post-credits scene, Amanda Waller and Rick Flag bring in Bronze Tiger and Deadshot, intending to recruit them into the Suicide Squad.
 Bronze Tiger appears as a playable character in Lego Batman 3: Beyond Gotham, voiced by Ike Amadi.
 Bronze Tiger appears as a playable character in Lego DC Super-Villains, voiced by Kane Jungbluth-Murry.

Miscellaneous
 Bronze Tiger appears in The Batman Adventures as a member of Black Mask's gang.
 Bronze Tiger received a figure in wave 18 of the DC Universe Classics line.
 Bronze Tiger makes a cameo appearance in a flashback in the Batman: Arkham Unhinged comic "Operation: Kill Joker".
 The Arrowverse incarnation of Bronze Tiger appears in the non-canon digital comic Arrow: Season 2.5. He and the Suicide Squad are tasked with eliminating the extremist sect, Onslaught. While fighting the group in Kahndaq, the squad captures one of the extremists and tortures them for information on Onslaught's leader, Khem-Adam. Once they get the information, the squad storm Khem-Adam's stronghold, though Bronze Tiger is killed by the Onslaught leader. Deadshot carries Bronze Tiger's body away to bury him in his home country.
 Bronze Tiger appears in Deathstroke: Knights & Dragons, voiced by Delbert Hunt. This version is an amoral mercenary who is far more villainous than his comics counterpart and works for H.I.V.E. under the command of fellow mercenary, Jackal. Together, they ambush Deathstroke as he is searching for his kidnapped son, Joseph. During the fight, Deathstroke severs Bronze Tiger's arm before setting the warehouse ablaze and leaving him and Jackal for dead, though Bronze Tiger manages to drag the latter to safety. Over the course of the following decade, Bronze Tiger receives a robotic, prosthetic arm and participates in the Kasnian civil war for five years, assisting both sides. He encounters Deathstroke again when the latter comes to him for information on H.I.V.E. The two fight once more until Deathstroke severs Bronze Tiger's prosthetic arm and forces him to give up the location of H.I.V.E.'s base. Once he gets the information, Deathstroke leaves aboard an advanced fighter jet and fires a missile at Bronze Tiger's base, destroying it and seemingly killing him and his men.

References

External links
Unofficial Guide to DC Comics entry

DC Comics martial artists
DC Comics superheroes
DC Comics supervillains
Fictional African-American people
Fictional assassins in comics
Comics characters introduced in 1975
Fictional secret agents and spies
Characters created by Dennis O'Neil
Batman characters
Suicide Squad members